Waikato District Council is the territorial authority for the Waikato District of New Zealand.

The council is led by the mayor of Waikato, who is currently . There are also ward councillors.

Composition
Mayor

Councillors

History

The council was established in 1989, replacing Raglan County Council (established in 1876), Waikato County Council (established in 1876), Ngāruawāhia Borough Council (established in 1920), and Huntly Borough Council (established in 1931).

References

External links

 Official website
 Map of wards

Waikato District
Politics of Waikato
Territorial authorities of New Zealand